East End Drugs is a historic commercial building located at Jefferson City, Cole County, Missouri. It was built between 1892 and 1898, and is a two-story, Romanesque Revival style brick two-part commercial block. It features a corner entrance, as well as a highly detailed cornice and attic level windows.  It has two individual storefronts on the first floor, and two apartments upstairs behind a single facade.

It was listed on the National Register of Historic Places in 2003.

References

Commercial buildings on the National Register of Historic Places in Missouri
Romanesque Revival architecture in Missouri
Commercial buildings completed in 1898
Buildings and structures in Jefferson City, Missouri
National Register of Historic Places in Cole County, Missouri